Raymond Poulidor (15 April 1936 – 13 November 2019), nicknamed "Pou-Pou", was a French professional racing cyclist, who rode for  his entire career.

His distinguished career coincided with two other outstanding riders – Jacques Anquetil and Eddy Merckx. This underdog position may have been the reason Poulidor was a favourite of the public. He was known as "The Eternal Second", because he never won the Tour de France despite finishing in second place three times, and in third place five times (including his final Tour at the age of 40). Despite his consistency, he never wore the yellow jersey as leader of the general classification in 14 Tours (of which he completed 12). He did win one Grand Tour, the 1964 Vuelta a España. Of the eighteen Grand Tours that he entered in his career, he finished in the top 10 fifteen times.

Early life and amateur career
Raymond Poulidor was the son of Martial and Maria Poulidor, small farmers outside the hamlet of Masbaraud-Mérignat, where the Creuse region east of Limoges meets the département of Haute-Vienne. Poulidor began working on the farm where, he remembered, "the soil was poor and we had to work hard; farming incomes were poor." The need for working hands on the farm meant he left school at 14 even though he wanted to continue his studies. Local entertainment went little further than village fairs, with coconut shies, sack-races, competitions for bottles of home-made jam... and inter-village cycle races. Poulidor continued to help out on his parents' farm even after he turned professional.

Poulidor was given his first bike by a local shop owner at the age of 14. He started racing bicycles at the age of 16, picking up the interest from the magazine Miroir-Sprint given to him by one of his school teachers. He initially hid his passion from his mother, who was afraid of the dangers the sport entailed.

It was only when Poulidor was taken into the army for compulsory national service in 1955 that he first travelled in a train. Pierre Chany, a French reporter who followed 49 Tours de France, drew the comparison with Poulidor's eventual rival, Jacques Anquetil: by the time Poulidor first stepped into a train, Anquetil had already been to Helsinki, ridden the Olympic Games, won a medal for France, turned professional and won the Grand Prix des Nations. Yet there was less than two years between them.

The army sent Poulidor to the war then going on in Algeria, where he worked as a driver and put on 12 kg through lack of exercise. In 1960 he dedicated himself to cycling again and lost the weight in a month. He won his first race after army service by six minutes. When he then came second in the GP de Peyrat-le-Château and won 80,000 old francs, he calculated that he had won more in one race than he would have earned in six years on the farm.

Professional career
Poulidor turned professional in 1960 with the Mercier team, directed by former Tour winner Antonin Magne. Magne offered Poulidor 25,000 old francs a month. Poulidor asked for 30,000. Magne countered that that was more than he paid Gauthier and Louis Privat and refused. Later, aware that he had a rival for Anquetil, he conceded.

In just his second season, Poulidor won Milan–San Remo, one of cycling's "monument classics".  from the finish, he was about to abandon after he suffered a puncture and was two minutes behind the leading riders. Magne convinced him to continue and Poulidor bridged the gap. On the climb of the Capo Berta, he attacked, joined by Albertus Geldermans and teammate Jean-Claude Annaert, who set the tempo until they reached the foot of the final climb, the Poggio. Here, Poulidor attacked again and opened a gap. Despite being guided in the wrong direction by a police man in the final corner, he was able to hold off the chasing field by three seconds to take the victory. Also in 1961, he became French road race champion.

The Anquetil years

Poulidor's rivalry with Anquetil is a legend in cycling. While a good climber, Poulidor had a hard time matching Anquetil in the individual time trial, often having victory snatched from him by losing time in time-trial stages of the Tour de France.

Poulidor's riding style was aggressive and attacking, whereas Anquetil preferred to control the race in the mountains and win time in the time-trials. Poulidor became the darling of the French public, to the ire of Anquetil. Poulidor's mid-France upbringing and his slow Limousin speech also contrasted with Anquetil's northern background and sharper accent. Poulidor's face was deeply tanned and furrowed; Anquetil had high cheekbones, a smoother face and brushed-up blond hair.

Poulidor's best chance of defeating Anquetil came in the 1964 Tour de France, in the finish on the Puy de Dôme. Anquetil rode beside Poulidor but both were so exhausted that only in the last few hundred metres could Poulidor take nearly enough time to threaten Anquetil's first place in the general classification. The Tour organiser, Jacques Goddet, was behind the pair as they turned off the main road and climbed through what police estimated as half a million spectators.

Anquetil rode on the inside by the mountain wall while Poulidor took the outer edge by the precipice. They could sometimes feel the other's hot gasps on their bare arms. At the end, Anquetil cracked, after a battle of wills and legs so intense that at times they banged elbows. Poulidor says he was so tired that he has no memory of the two touching, although a photograph shows that they did. Of Anquetil, the veteran French reporter Pierre Chany wrote: "His face, until then purple, lost all its colour; the sweat ran down in drops through the creases of his cheeks." Anquetil was only semiconscious, he said. Poulidor gained time but when they reached Paris, Anquetil still had a 55-second lead and won his last Tour de France thanks to the time-trial on the final day.

Anquetil-Poulidor: the social significance
Anquetil unfailingly beat Poulidor in the Tour de France and yet Poulidor remained the more popular. "The more unlucky I was, the more the public liked me and the more money I earned", he said. Divisions between fans became marked, which two sociologists studying the impact of the Tour on French society say became emblematic of France old and new. Research showed that more than 4,000 newspaper articles appeared about him in France in just 1974 and that no other rider "had ever incited so many sociological investigations, so many university theses, seeking to find the cause of his prodigious popularity."

Poupou, the nickname
Poulidor's original nickname was Pouli. It was Émile Besson of the daily newspaper L'Humanité who first wrote of Poupou. The name was taken up throughout France, leading to headlines such as "Poupoularité" in L'Équipe. A poupée is a doll and the nickname hints at that and follows the French tradition of repeating the first syllable of a word in childspeak. Poulidor never liked the name but accepted it.

The Merckx years

The end of the Anquetil era presented opportunities for Poulidor to finally win the Tour de France. This was not to be due to injuries in 1967 and 1968, and the arrival of Eddy Merckx in 1969. Poulidor was no match for Merckx, although he offered much resistance.

In the 1973 Tour Poulidor almost lost his life on the descent from the Col de Portet d'Aspet when he plunged into a ravine, taking a serious blow to the head and crawling out with the help of the race director, Jacques Goddet.

Poulidor and Dr Mabuse
Antonin Magne remained manager of Poulidor's Mercier team until 1970, when he was replaced by another former rider, Louis Caput. Caput brought with him as deputy directeur sportif a man who described himself as a homeopath, Bernard Sainz.
Sainz is known in cycling as Dr Mabuse, after a pulp-fiction character created by Norbert Jacques. Mabuse is a criminal mastermind who becomes rich through hypnotic powers. He plots to take over the world but is foiled by the police. From his cell he masterminds criminal plots by writing endless gibberish. Sainz recognises the nickname and used it in the name of his autobiography.

Sainz is a former velodrome rider of national level who stopped racing after a fall and became involved in horse racing, where he was twice convicted of maltreating horses. It was in horse-racing, where he turned unremarkable animals into champions, that he acquired his nickname. He has been repeatedly investigated by police and has been convicted of illegally practising medicine and incitement to doping. Sainz claims that he only engages in homeopathic treatment, though whatever methods he engages in are effective, casting doubt on this claim.

Louis Caput approached Edmond Mercier, the bicycle-maker behind Poulidor's team, and asked to bring Sainz into the team management. Mercier agreed, said Sainz, because he was already treating Mercier for his own health problems. Mercier had also brought in the insurance company, GAN, as main sponsor. GAN, said Sainz, demanded that Poulidor be in the team photo even if all he did was train with the team at the start of the season. In 1971 Poulidor had decided against riding any more. The tactic, Sainz said, was bluff, to increase his motivation. In Paris–Nice, the first important stage race of the season, Poulidor was 22 seconds behind Eddy Merckx on the morning of the last day. Poulidor attacked from the start, setting a speed record on the Col de la Turbie that stood for more than 10 years and won Paris–Nice by two seconds. Next year he won Paris–Nice again and also the Critérium du Dauphiné Libéré.

Drug testing
Raymond Poulidor was the first rider to be tested for drugs in the Tour de France. Testers arrived at the Tour for the first time in 1966, in Bordeaux, although only after word had spread and many riders had left their hotels. The first competitor they found was Poulidor.

A few other riders were found, including Rik Van Looy, and some obliged and others refused. Next morning, the race left the city on the way to the Pyrenees and stopped in the suburb of Gradignan, in the university area of La House. The riders climbed off and began walking, shouting protests in general and in particular abuse at the race doctor, Pierre Dumas, whom some demanded should also take a test to see if he'd been drinking wine or taking aspirin to make his own job easier. Riders also criticised Poulidor for accepting to be tested. He dismissed their protests and stayed at the back of the strike. Other prominent riders, including Jacques Anquetil, were at the front. Poulidor said his indifference to the controls and the strike harmed his relations with fellow riders. "After that, they did me no favours in the peloton", he said.

Retirement and death

Poulidor has several times accepted that his career was handicapped by a lack of ambition and by the psychological domination of Jacques Anquetil. Poulidor said in an interview in 1992: I knew straight away that I was getting places everywhere. I got all the leaders' jerseys but I used to lose them. Tonin [Magne] said to me "Raymond, you're always in a daydream!" And was that true? Were you distracted? It was true. I thought what was happening to me was already marvellous enough. I never thought of winning. Never, ever, did I get up in the morning with the idea of winning!

On 25 January 1973 Poulidor was made a Chevalier de la Légion d'honneur. In 2003 the President, Jacques Chirac increased the award. Poulidor also has a rose named after him, reflecting his love of gardening in general and roses in particular.

He lived with his wife Gisèle in Saint-Léonard-de-Noblat, east of Limoges, where he made short trips on his mountain bike. Their daughter, Corinne, is married to the former world cyclo-cross champion and Tour of Flanders winner Adri van der Poel.  His grandsons David and Mathieu are also cyclists. Mathieu van der Poel became cyclo-cross world champion himself in the junior race in Koksijde in 2012 (Koksijde) and in 2013 in Louisville, and with the Elite in 2015 (Tábor), 2019 (Bogense), 2020 (Dübendorf), 2021 (Ostend), and 2023 (Hoogerheide). Mathieu has also had great success on the road with his most highly regarded victories including the Amstel Gold Race in 2019, the Tour of Flanders in 2020, Milano-San Remo in 2023, and stage 2 of the 2021 Tour de France where he dedicated his win and yellow jersey to his grandfather.

Poulidor worked in public relations for Crédit Lyonnais, sponsor of the yellow jersey, during the Tour. He had bicycles made under his name by the France-Loire company, and has appeared in television commercials aimed at older people.

When asked about his longevity compared to fellow cyclists, Poulidor said he took things in moderation and did not overstretch himself.

Poulidor has written several biographies, the first of which was Gloire sans le Maillot Jaune, written in 1964. Poulidor Intime was published in May 2007 by Éditions Jacob-Duvernet in France. In 2004 he helped write Poulidor par Raymond Poulidor with the radio reporter Jean-Paul Brouchon. The preface is by Eddy Merckx.

On 13 November 2019, Raymond Poulidor died in Saint-Léonard-de-Noblat. He had been in a hospital for two months prior, having suffered from heart problems.

Career achievements

Major results
Source:

1959
 3rd Grand Prix d'Oradour-sur-Vayres
1960
 1st Bordeaux–Saintes
 1st Overall Prestige Pernod
 2nd Nice–Mont Agel
 3rd Grand Prix de Fourmies
 3rd Overall Super Prestige Pernod
 4th Grand Prix du Midi Libre
 5th Road race, UCI Road World Championships
 7th Paris–Tours
 10th Overall Critérium du Dauphiné Libéré
1961
 1st  Road race, National Road Championships
 1st Milan–San Remo
 1st Mont Faron hill climb
 1st Overall Challenge Yellow
 2nd Overall Four Days of Dunkirk
 2nd Nice–Mont Agel
 2nd Monaco–Mont Agel
 2nd Overall Super Prestige Pernod
 3rd Gênes–Nice
 3rd Grand Prix du Midi Libre
 3rd Grand Prix de Cannes
3rd  Road race, UCI Road World Championships
 7th Bordeaux–Paris
 9th Overall Paris–Nice
 9th Paris–Bruxelles
 1962
 3rd Overall Tour de France
1st Stage 19
 3rd Critérium du Dauphiné Libéré
 3rd Grand Prix de Nice
 5th Paris–Roubaix
 7th Overall Paris–Nice
 7th Overall Super Prestige Pernod
 8th Grand Prix du Midi Libre
1963
 1st La Flèche Wallonne
 1st Grand Prix des Nations
 1st Gran Premio di Lugano
 1st Overall Challenge Yellow
 1st Critérium National
 2nd Grand Prix de Cannes
 2nd Trofeo Baracchi (with Jacques Anquetil)
 2nd Gênes–Nice
 2nd Overall Prestige Pernod
 3rd Overall Super Prestige Pernod
 3rd Paris–Tours
 3rd Paris–Luxembourg
 5th Road race, UCI Road World Championships
 5th Liège–Bastogne–Liège
 8th Overall Tour de France
 9th 1963 Tour of Flanders
1964
 1st Overall Critérium National
1st Stage 2b (ITT)
 1st Grand Prix de Cannes
 1st Grand Prix de Soissons
 1st Ronde de Seignelay
 1st  Overall Vuelta a España
1st Stage 15 (ITT)
 1st Stage 1 Circuit du Provençal
 1st Overall Super Prestige Pernod
 1st Overall Prestige Pernod
 1st Overall Challenge Yellow
 2nd Overall Tour de France
1st Stage 15
 2nd Milan–San Remo
 2nd Grand Prix d'Antibes
 2nd Overall Critérium du Dauphiné Libéré
1st Stages 2 & 4a (ITT)
 2nd Overall Tour de Haute-Loire
 3rd  Road race, UCI Road World Championships
 7th Overall Paris–Nice
1st Stage 7
1965
 1st Overall Escalada a Montjuïc
 2nd Overall Tour de France
1st Stages 5b (ITT) and 14
 2nd Overall Vuelta a España
1st Stages 4a (ITT) and 16 (ITT)
 2nd Overall Critérium du Dauphiné Libéré
 2nd Overall Prestige Pernod
 4th Overall Super Prestige Pernod
 3rd Grand Prix des Nations
 4th Overall Paris–Nice
 4th Trofeo Baracchi (with Georges Chappe)
 6th Giro di Lombardia
1966
 1st Overall Critérium National
1st Stage 2b (ITT)
 1st Overall Critérium du Dauphiné Libéré
1st Stage 7b (ITT)
 3rd Overall Tour de France
1st Stage 14b (ITT)
 1st Stage 2 (ITT) Paris–Nice
 1st Subida a Arrate
 1st Overall Challenge Yellow
 1st Overall Prestige Pernod
 2nd Trofeo Baracchi (with Georges Chappe)
 3rd  Road race, UCI Road World Championships
 3rd Giro di Lombardia
 3rd Grand Prix d'Aix-en-Provence
 3rd Grand Prix de Monaco
 3rd Overall Super Prestige Pernod
 5th Grand Prix des Nations
 7th Milan–San Remo
1967
 1st Bol d'Or des Monédières Chaumeil
 1st Circuit de l'Aulne
 1st A Travers Lausanne
 1st Overall Escalada a Montjuïc
 2nd Overall Critérium National
 3rd Giro di Lombardia
 3rd Polymultipliée
 3rd Grand Prix du Midi Libre
 4th Overall Prestige Pernod
 8th Overall Vuelta a España
1st Stage 15b (ITT)
 9th Overall Tour de France
1st Stage 22b (ITT)
 7th Paris–Roubaix
1968
1st Overall Critérium National
1st Overall Escalada a Montjuïc
1st Subida a Arrate
2nd Overall Prestige Pernod
3rd Overall Four Days of Dunkirk
1st Stage 3 (ITT)
1st Stage 3 Tour of Belgium
3rd A Travers Lausanne
5th Milan–San Remo
6th Paris–Roubaix
7th Road race, UCI Road World Championships
8th Overall Tour de Suisse
1969
1st Overall Critérium du Dauphiné Libéré
1st Stages 1a & 5a
1st Overall Tour du Haut Var
1st Overall Challenge Yellow
1st Overall Prestige Pernod
2nd Overall Paris–Nice
1st Stage 1a (ITT)
3rd Overall Tour de France
1st Stage 4a (ITT) Tour of the Basque Country
2nd Grand Prix des Nations
2nd Grand Prix d'Aix-en-Provence
4th Grand Prix du Midi Libre
4th Overall Super Prestige Pernod
5th Giro di Lombardia
1970
2nd Setmana Catalana de Ciclisme
2nd A Travers Lausanne
2nd Overall Prestige Pernod
4th Overall Paris–Nice
7th Overall Tour de France
8th Liège–Bastogne–Liège
8th Grand Prix des Nations
10th La Flèche Wallonne
1971
1st Overall Critérium National
1st Setmana Catalana de Ciclisme
1st Overall Étoile des Espoirs
1st Stage 5
2nd Overall Tour of the Basque Country
3rd Overall Prestige Pernod
4th Overall Critérium du Dauphiné Libéré
6th Grand Prix des Nations
9th Overall Vuelta a España
1972
1st Critérium des As
1st Overall Critérium National
1st Overall Paris–Nice
1st Stage 7b (ITT)
1st Overall Challenge Yellow
1st Overall Prestige Pernod
2nd Overall Setmana Catalana de Ciclisme
1st Stage 1 (ITT)
2nd La Flèche Wallonne
2nd Overall Super Prestige Pernod
3rd Overall Tour de France
4th Grand Prix des Nations
4th Grand Prix du Midi Libre
7th Overall Critérium du Dauphiné Libéré
10th Paris–Roubaix
1973
 1st GP de Soissons
 1st Grand Prix du Midi Libre
 1st Overall Paris–Nice
 1st Overall Challenge Yellow
 2nd Overall Prestige Pernod
 3rd A Travers Lausanne
 4th Liège–Bastogne–Liège
 7th Overall Critérium du Dauphiné Libéré
 9th Grand Prix des Nations
 9th Overall Super Prestige Pernod
 10th Paris–Roubaix
1974
 2nd Overall Tour de France
1st Stage 16
 2nd Overall Critérium du Dauphiné Libéré
1st Stage 6b
 2nd  Road race, UCI Road World Championships
 2nd Overall Prestige Pernod
 4th Overall Super Prestige Pernod
 5th Overall Paris–Nice
 5th Overall Tour de Romandie
1st Prologue (ITT)
1975
 2nd Overall Tour du Limousin
1st Stage 3
 2nd Overall Prestige Pernod
 3rd Paris–Bourges
 4th Overall Critérium du Dauphiné Libéré
 7th Grand Prix du Midi Libre
1976
 3rd Overall Tour de France
 2nd Overall Prestige Pernod
 4th Grand Prix du Midi Libre
 5th Giro di Lombardia
 7th Overall Super Prestige Pernod
 8th Liège–Bastogne–Liège
1977
 6th Overall Paris–Nice

Grand Tour general classification results timeline

References

Bibliography

Further reading

External links

 

1936 births
2019 deaths
French male cyclists
French Tour de France stage winners
French Vuelta a España stage winners
Vuelta a España winners
Sportspeople from Creuse
Super Prestige Pernod winners
Cyclists from Nouvelle-Aquitaine